Dewanganj railway station is a railway station in Raisen district of Madhya Pradesh. Its code is DWG. The station consists of three platforms. Passenger trains halt here.

References

Railway stations in Raisen district
Bhopal railway division